The 2007 Torridge District Council election took place on 3 May 2007 to elect members of Torridge District Council in Devon, England. The whole council was up for election and independents lost overall control of the council to no overall control.

Election result
The Conservatives gained 7 seats, while independents lost 9 seats to mean that no group had a majority on the council, with both the Conservatives and independents finishing on 13 councillors. The Conservative gains came after the number of candidates the party fielded increased from 4 at the 2003 election to 22 in 2007. Among the independents to lose their seats was the council leader Pat Ferguson, who was defeated in Bideford South  after having previously represented Three Moors ward.

Meanwhile, the Liberal Democrats increased by 1 to 8 seats and the Greens also gained 1 seat to have 2 councillors. 7 councillors were elected unopposed, the highest number in the country at the 2007 local elections. Overall turnout at the election was 42.1%, up from 38.4% in 2003.

Following the election the leader of the Conservative group on the council, James Morrish, became the youngest leader of the council at the age of 34.

Ward results

By-elections between 2007 and 2011

Hartland and Bradworthy
A by-election was held in Hartland and Bradworthy ward after the death of the longest serving councillor in Torridge, Bill Pillman, who had first stood for the council in 1976. The seat was gained for the Liberal Democrats by Brian Redwood by a majority of 469 votes.

Holsworthy
Independent Pam Johns won a by-election in Holsworthy with a majority of 66 votes after the death of Liberal Democrat councillor Des Shadrick.

References

2007
2007 English local elections
2000s in Devon